The Atlantic yellow-nosed albatross (Thalassarche chlororhynchos) is a large seabird in the albatross family Diomedeidae. 

This small mollymawk was once considered conspecific with the Indian yellow-nosed albatross and known as the yellow-nosed albatross. Some authorities still consider these taxa to be conspecific, such as the Clements checklist and the SACC, which recognizes that a proposal is needed.

Taxonomy
The Atlantic yellow-nosed albatross was formally described in 1789 by the German naturalist Johann Friedrich Gmelin in his revised and expanded edition of Carl Linnaeus's Systema Naturae. He placed it with the albatrosses in the genus Diomedea and coined the binomial name Diomedea chlororhynchos. Gmelin based his description on the "yellow-nosed albatross" that had been described and illustrated in 1785 by the English ornithologist John Latham from a specimen that had been collected off the coast of the Cape of Good Hope. The Atlantic yellow-nosed albatross is now one of nine species placed in the genus Thalassarche that was introduced in 1853 by the German naturalist Ludwig Reichenbach. The genus name combines the Ancient Greek thalassa meaning "sea" and arkhē meaning "power" or "command" (from arkhō, to govern). The specific epithet chlororhynchos combines the Ancient Greek khlōros meaning "yellow" with rhunkhos meaning "bill". The species is monotypic: no subspecies are recognised.

Description
The Atlantic yellow-nosed albatross averages  in length. It is a typical black and white mollymawk with a grey head and large eye patch, and its nape and hindneck are white. Its bill is black with a yellow culminicorn and a pink tip. It has a blackish grey saddle, tail and upperwing, and its underparts are predominantly white. Its underwing and primaries show a narrow black margin. The juvenile is similar to the adult but with a white head and black bill. It can be differentiated from the Indian yellow-nosed by its darker head. Relative to other mollymawks it can be distinguished by its smaller size (the wings being particularly narrow) and the thin black edging to the underwing, The grey-headed albatross has a similar grey head but more extensive and less well defined black markings around the edge of the underwing. Salvin's albatross also has a grey head but has much broader wings, a pale bill and even narrower black borders to the underwing.

Distribution
Atlantic yellow-nosed albatrosses nest on islands in the mid-Atlantic, including Tristan da Cunha (Inaccessible Island, Middle Island, Nightingale Island, Stoltenhoff Island) and Gough Island.  At sea they range across the south Atlantic from South America to Africa between 15°S and 45°S.

Behaviour

Feeding
This mollymawk feeds on squid, fish, cuttlefish and crustacea. The yellow-nosed Albatross sometimes hunts at night instead of day.

Breeding

Like all albatrosses they are colonial, but unusually they will build their nests in scrubs, on top of cliffs   amongst Blechnum tree ferns. Like all mollymawks they build pedestal nests of mud, peat, feathers, and vegetation to lay their one egg in. They do this in September or early October, and the chick fledges in late March to April. They breed annually.

Conservation

A 2001 population estimate breaks down the population and shows some trends. Gough Island has 5,300 breeding pairs, between 16,000 and 30,000 breeding pairs on Tristan da Cunha Island, 4,500 on Nightingale Island, between 100 and 200 pairs on Middle Island, and 500 pairs on Stoltenhoff Island, and 1,100 on Inaccessible Island. This adds up to between 27,500 and 41,600 pairs per year for the total between 55,000 and 83,200 total adult birds. This population estimate was done in 1983, however and is outdated. Trends suggest a 50% decrease over 72 years.

The largest threat is from longline fishing, as harvesting of chicks and adults has been outlawed.

Efforts to help conserve this bird are underway, with counting of the birds on Gough Island. Also, Gough Island and Inaccessible Island are nature preserves, and Gough Island is a World Heritage Site. The Tristan da Cunha population is being remotely tracked and counted, and the South East Atlantic Fisheries Commission has passed a resolution that all fishing vessels use a tori line and drop lines at night.

References

Sources

External links

Species factsheet - BirdLife International
Photos and fact file - ARKive
 Yellownosed Albatross - Species text in The Atlas of Southern African Birds.

Thalassarche
Procellariiformes
Birds of Brazil
Birds of the Atlantic Ocean
Birds of Southern Africa
Birds of islands of the Atlantic Ocean
Birds of subantarctic islands
Birds of Uruguay
Fauna of Gough Island
Endangered fauna of Africa
Endangered fauna of South America
Atlantic yellow-nosed Albatross
Atlantic yellow-nosed Albatross